The sixth competition weekend of the 2013–14 ISU Speed Skating World Cup was held in the Thialf arena in Heerenveen, Netherlands, from Friday, 14 March, until Sunday, 16 March 2014.

Schedule of events
As this was the final competition weekend for the season, only Division A races were held. The detailed schedule of events:

All times are CET (UTC+1).

Medal summary

Men's events

Women's events

References

 
6
Isu World Cup, 2013-14, 6
ISU Speed Skating World Cup, 2013-14, World Cup 6